Mickaël Nadé (born 4 March 1999) is a French professional footballer who plays as defender for  club Saint-Étienne.

Club career
Nadé is a youth exponent of AAS Sarcelles. In July 2014, he joined the youth side of Saint-Étienne. He made his Ligue 1 debut on 20 May 2017 against Nancy.

In July 2020, Nadé joined Quevilly-Rouen on a season-long loan.

Personal life
Born in France, Nadé is of Ivorian descent.

Career statistics

References

External links
LFP profile

1999 births
Living people
Association football defenders
French footballers
French sportspeople of Ivorian descent
Black French sportspeople
Ligue 1 players
Championnat National players
Championnat National 2 players
Championnat National 3 players
Ligue 2 players
AS Saint-Étienne players
US Quevilly-Rouen Métropole players